Vasconcellea palandensis is a species of plant in the family Caricaceae. It is endemic to Ecuador.  Its natural habitat is subtropical or tropical moist montane forest. It is threatened by habitat loss.

It was previously placed in genus Carica.

References

palandensis
Flora of Ecuador
Vulnerable plants
Taxonomy articles created by Polbot